Jana Henke (born 1 October 1973 in Löbau, Saxony) is a former freestyle swimmer from Germany, who won the bronze medal in the 800 m freestyle at the 1992 Summer Olympics in Barcelona, Spain. She competed in three Summer Olympics for her native country.

References
 

1973 births
Living people
People from Löbau
German female swimmers
German female freestyle swimmers
Olympic swimmers of Germany
Swimmers at the 1992 Summer Olympics
Swimmers at the 2000 Summer Olympics
Swimmers at the 2004 Summer Olympics
Olympic bronze medalists for Germany
Olympic bronze medalists in swimming
World Aquatics Championships medalists in swimming
European Aquatics Championships medalists in swimming
Medalists at the 1992 Summer Olympics
Sportspeople from Saxony
20th-century German women
21st-century German women